Millau is a commune in the Aveyron department in the Occitanie region in Southern France. With a population of 22,002 as of 2018, it is situated at the confluence of the rivers Tarn and Dourbie, and is surrounded by the landscapes of Gorges du Tarn and Causse du Larzac. It is part of the former province of Rouergue where people also communicate through Rouergat, a dialect of the Occitan language. Its inhabitants are called Millavois (masculine) and Millavoises (feminine). The territory of the commune is part of the Regional Natural Park of Grands Causses, part of the larger Causses and Cévennes UNESCO World Heritage Site.

History 

The town dates back nearly 3000 years when it was situated on the Granède hills which dominate the town. In the second or first century B.C, it would move to the alluvial plain on the left bank of the Tarn. The plain gave the town its Gallic name of Condatomagus (Contado meaning confluence and magus for the market). The site of Condatomagus was identified in the 19th century by Dieudonné Rey; it was close to the major earthenware centre in the Roman Empire, La Graufesenque. This is where luxury ceramics such as red terra sigillata were made. Despite major new developments in the late twentieth and early twenty-first centuries, the centre of the old Roman and medieval town on the opposite (left) bank of the Tarn remains poorly excavated, and the newly renovated Maison du Peuple, almost on the site of the old Roman forum, saw no archaeological dig prior to the excavation of the new, very deep, foundations. The local museum sits almost adjacent to this site.

By the second century A.D. trade had collapsed from competition, and subsequent barbarian invasions during the fourth and fifth centuries saw the town relocate to the opposite bank, changing its name to Amiliavum, then to Milhau en Rouergat (in the Millhau language), then to the French Millhau.

By the ninth century the town had grown. It a seat of viguerie, a mediaeval administrative court, and a centre for the production of lambskin gloves. Ramparts surrounded the town. The tenth and eleventh centuries saw the creation of the Viscount of Millau and subsequently passed to the Counts of Provence, the Counts of Barcelona and eventually, in 1112, to the father of the future King of Aragon, Béranger III following his marriage to the daughter of the Viscount of Millau. In 1187, the King of Aragon grants him the seal and communal freedom of Provence by Consular Charter. A consulate was thus created, and was responsible for administering the city to raise taxes and to apply justice. In 1271, Millau passed to the crown of the kings of France.

In 1361, during the Hundred Years War, the city came under English rule. The return to peace in the fifteenth century gave the city a boost. It is Louis XI which connects Millau to the crown in 1476 by letters patent.

In the Middle Ages the town had one of the main mediaeval bridges across the river Tarn. It had 17 arches, but after one poorly-maintained arch collapsed in the 18th century, the bridge was mostly demolished. Only one arch remains, with a mill that is now an art gallery, as testament to this significant trading route from north to south across pre-Renaissance France.

In 1999, José Bové, a local Larzac anti-globalisation activist demolished the Millau McDonald's as it was being built, in symbolic protest of the decision by the Court of the World Trade Organization to allow the United States to overtax the import of the local cheese called Roquefort, in retaliation for the European Union refusing the import of US hormone-treated meat. It was also an opportunity to protest against the spread of fast food, Americanization, and the spread of 'Genetically Modified Organisms/crops' (GMO). The McDonald's was soon rebuilt, and Bové spent a few weeks in jail. He is now a representative at the European Parliament.

The Millau Viaduct was completed in 2004, eliminating traffic jams from the town centre. The town is now a tourist centre with one of the largest campsites in central France, benefiting from the attractive surrounding landscape, and the architecturally-acclaimed Millau viaduct. It is also a major centre for outdoor sporting activity.

Heraldry 

The traditional arms of the city of Millau are "Gold with four pallets gules, a chief azure three gold fleurs-de-lis."

This has been the arms of the Crown of Aragon since 1187, but since 1271 surmounted with the leader of France (Azure three fleurs de lys) indicating that this is a bonne ville (good town), i.e. a commune reporting directly to the king. The city itself was administered through elected consuls – like Toulouse and its sheriffs – while the king was the sole and direct lord. Few cities in France enjoyed such an autonomous regime.

Geography 
The territory of this town lies across a southern portion of the Massif Central. The municipality lies at the heart of the Grands Causses, a part of the Causse Rouge (east of the plateau Lévézou), and part of Larzac as well as part of the Black Causse. The city county seat is located in the lower part of the town, in a large depression at the confluence of the Tarn and Dourbie, at an altitude of about 340 m.

The territory surrounding the town of Millau is characterized by livestock production and the maintaining of natural grasslands, fields and temporary pastures. A multitude of gorges, ravines and defiles give the landscape its character. These predominantly agricultural rural areas like the rest of this fragile region, are protected by the Regional Natural Park of Grands Causses.

The area's flora consists of over 2000 species. There is a triple-leaved asparagus, Montpellier aphyllanthe, honeysuckle from the Etruria region of Italy. During the summer, the highest land of the municipality does not retain rain water and becomes arid. Some game in the area is protected and regulated by the hunting missions which gather quails, Hobby falcon, hawks, lizards, deer, wild boars, deer and mountain sheep.

The expansion of the bed of the river Tarn in the city and the creation of a raw discharge linked to its expansion has slowed and lowered the level of the river that now sees the proliferation of aquatic buttercup which is reveling in the stagnant water. This has also led to a decline in wild populations of brown trout in this sector. Also waterproofing concrete and paving large areas has increased significantly water from rain discharged directly to the river inducing a phenomenon called "flush" that is quite destructive to aquatic fauna and the banks.

Climate 
There are three distinct climatic effects felt in the region. In spring and autumn, the westerly winds and southwest produce an oceanic climate. In summer, winds from the southeast predominate and the weather is more Mediterranean, but these winds can also disrupt the normal course of the season at any time of the year. In winter, northern winds submit this country to the rigors of continental climate.

Administration 
Millau is a sub-prefecture of the Aveyron department in the Occitanie region.

The 'Community of Communes of Millau Grands Causses' was created on June 22, 1989, comprising Aguessac, Compeyre, Creissels, Millau and Paulhe. Today the community consists of 15 towns with the addition of Comprégnac, Saint-Georges-de-Luzençon, La Roque-Sainte-Marguerite, Saint-André-de-Vézines, Mostuéjouls, Peyreleau, Rivière-sur-Tarn and Veyreau.

Education 
The education establishments in the town of Millau report to the Academy of Toulouse. The Public school is the College Marcel Aymard, a technological and professional General School. The Private school is the College and Lycée Jeanne d'Arc. Vocational education can be found at the 2iSA (Computer Institute South Aveyron). Higher Education includes the Institute of Nursing Training (IFSI), BTS qualifications can be done at Jean Vigo High School, and Higher Education at the Conservatoire National des Arts et Métiers (CNAM) of Millau.

Transport 

The Millau Viaduct, the tallest cable-stayed road bridge in the world, which carries the A75 autoroute across the valley of the Tarn near Millau, relieves the town of much traffic, especially during the summer months.

Economy 
The city is the seat of the Chamber of Commerce and Industry of South Aveyron Millau. The municipality operates the airfield of Millau-Larzac. Having been recognized for over a century as the "capital of leather and glove" Millau is renowned for its activity tannery (leather gloves). The town is best known for its sheepskin gloves, for which it led the French fashion industry for two centuries. It gained the title of "City and Art Professions" in 2000.

Agricultural production, including Roquefort cheese made from raw sheep's milk, is essential to the economic activity of the region are 43 farms in this town and their activities strongly shape the landscape. Since 1993, a series of four major night markets, organized by farmer-producers associated among Farmers of Aveyron, currently take place in the evening from July to August on Mandarous Square, the main square of the city center. Since that time, in November, the autumn fair of farm products is organized by the same association of farmers and runs for two days at Victory Park in Millau.

Tourism 
 The glove museum
 The Jardin botanique des Causses, a botanical garden
 The Place du Maréchal Foch, a square with 12th century arcades, one of which carries the inscription Gara qué faras or Watch what you are doing
 Église Notre-Dame-de-l'Espinasse. This church allegedly once possessed a part of the Crown of Thorns, making it an important pilgrimage centre in the Middle Ages. The church was destroyed in 1582 but rebuilt in the 17th century. The frescoes from 1939 are by Jean Bernard, the stained-glass windows from 1984 by Claude Baillon.
 The Passage du Pozous is a 13th-century fortified gateway
 The Belfry, a 12th-century square tower topped by an octagonal 17th-century tower on the place Emma Calvé
 Millau is the main centre in France for paragliding
 Micropolis; the city of insects, is at nearby Saint-Léons
 The medieval walled Knights Templar town of La Couvertoirade is nearby
 The nearby caves for Roquefort cheese production

Historical buildings 
There are 11 listed buildings are historical monuments in the town of Millau :
 The archaeological site Graufesenque, two kilometers from Millau, is a remnant of the Gallo -Roman city of Condatomagus which was a major center of ceramic production in the Gallo- Roman era.
 Notre- Dame de l'Espinasse built in the twelfth century. It takes its name from a relic of the crown of thorns once kept in his treasure. Destroyed in the sixteenth century, it was rebuilt a century later through taking a toll on the river Tarn. Its bell tower is Toulouse style.
 Belfry of Millau is composed of two parts corresponding to two different eras. The square tower was built in the twelfth century on the site of the original castle of the Counts of Millau. He assured the safety of the fortifications in the southwest corner. At the beginning of the seventeenth century the consuls of Millau did build above the octagonal tower. The square tower was used as a prison from the seventeenth to the nineteenth century and especially during the revolutionary period. The building was burned by lightning July 29, 1811. After climbing the 210 steps, it has a 360 ° view.
 Washhouse of the Ayrolle. The roof dates from the eighteenth century.
 Old Mill and Old Bridge (on the Tarn).
 Hotel Sambucy de Sorgues also called Sambucy castle and its gardens. Built between 1672 and 1674 Jacques Duchesne, advisor to the king, especially master of waters and forests of Rouergue and receiver of the election of Millau. After his marriage it becomes the home of Mark Antony Sambucy, capitoul of Toulouse in 1745.
 Hotel Sambucy de Miers, acquired in the seventeenth century by Antoine de Sambucy.
 The Halls (1899): metal construction of the Belle Époque.
 La rue Droit: Roman road.
 The hotel Pégayrolles built in 1738, which now houses the museum. The Millau Museum has a rich collection of pottery called Samian from the Gallo-Roman as well as collections of tannery and glove on the history of the glove time.
 The Church of the Sacred Heart (the largest church in the city) dated nineteenth century, neo-Byzantine style. The church has a carillon of 21 bells.

Population 
In 2017, the municipality had 22,109 inhabitants.

International relations 

Millau is twinned with:
  Louga, Senegal (1962)
  Bad Salzuflen, Germany (1975)
  Bridlington, UK (1992)
  Sagunto, Spain (2006)
  Mostar, Bosnia and Herzegovina (2006)
  Mealhada, Portugal (2010)

Notable people
 Justin Benoît (1813-1893), physician and anatomist.

In fiction 
Part of Ian McEwan's award-winning novel Atonement (2001) centers on Briony Tallis, a nurse in a London hospital in June 1940, to which wounded British and French soldiers evacuated from Dunkirk were brought. In a poignant passage, she is comforting Luc Cornet, a young soldier from Millau who is dying of severe head wounds. In his delirium he talks of the town, of his family and his father's boulangerie where he worked, and mistakes Tallis for his own fiancée.

After he dies, Tallis for a moment imagines the life she might have had if Luc had survived and if she had married him and come to live with him in Millau: 

The Millau countryside also played an important part in the French film Total Western, by Eric Rochant.

Gallery

See also 

 Communes of the Aveyron department
 List of medieval bridges in France

Notes

References

Bibliography 
Public Books :

 ARTIERES, Jules, Millau à travers les siècles, Millau, 1943, p. 558
 AMIS DU MUSEE DE MILLAU, Millau. Histoire et secrets oubliés, Millau, 1996, p. 279
 GIRARD, Georges, Des rues des hommes, Millau, 1987.
 La Graufesenque (Millau, Aveyron). Vol. 1 : Condatomagos, une agglomération de confluent en territoire rutène iie siècle aC – iiie siècle pC par Daniel Schaad. Vol. 2 : Sigillées lisses et autres productions par Martine Genin, Fédération Aquitania, 2007–2008. (vol. 1) et 978-2-910763-10-7 (vol. 2).
 Monique Fournier & Michel Delmouly : Paroles ouvrières, paroles gantières. Amis du Musée de Millau. 1998.
 Millau 1911 : Avec les gantiers en grève. Association pour la promotion de l'histoire sociale millavoise. 2011.

University publications :

 BERNAD, Louis, Une ville de consulat : Millau en Rouergue. Thèse: Droit, Montpellier, 1938.
 CARBASSE, Jean-Marie, Notes sur l'administration municipale de Millau de la fin du xviie s. au début du xviiie. Mémoire: Droit, Montpellier, 1969.
 GARNIER, Florent, Un consulat et ses finances : Millau, 1187–1461. Paris : Comité pour l'histoire économique et financière de la France, 2006. Texte remanié de sa thèse : Le consulat de Millau au bas Moyen Âge : finances, pouvoir et société. Thèse: Histoire du Droit, Paris, 2002.
 LAUR, Frédéric, Le Consulat de Millau sous la Monarchie Absolue, Nîmes 1998, 395 p. Ce livre reprend sa thèse de Droit, Montpellier, 1985 : Pouvoir et société à Millau de 1632 à 1789.
 LOURDOU, Magali. Les Protestants et le consulat millavois au temps des premières guerres de religion (vers 1560 – vers 1574). In Revue du Rouergue. 2003 (73) : p. 49 – 65.
 MONTARNAL, Louis, Millau et la rupture du traité de Brétigny. Thèse: Droit, Paris, 1952.
 SEKIOU, Magda. Millau pendant la seconde guerre mondiale : La vie économique et sociale. In Revue du Rouergue. 2000 (64) : p. 595 – 617.

External links 

  Millau city council website 
 Tourist office website in French, in Dutch and in Spanish

Communes of Aveyron
Subprefectures in France
Ruteni
Rouergue